The 2006–07 LNB Pro A season was the 85th season of the French Basketball Championship and the 20th season since inception of the Ligue Nationale de Basketball (LNB) . The regular season started on September 23, 2006 and ended on April 27, 2007. The play-offs were held from May 15, 2007 till June 2, 2007.

Roanne, after finishing at the second top seed of the regular season, won its second French Pro A League title by defeating Nancy in playoffs final (81-74).

Promotion and relegation 
Due to the change of the LNB Pro A league format from 18 clubs to 16 between the 2006–07 and 2007–08 seasons, only 1 club is promoted from 2006 to 2007 LNB Pro B league (French 2nd division) and 3 clubs are sent to 2007-08 Pro B league.

 At the beginning of the 2006–07 season
Teams promoted from 2005 to 2006 Pro B
 Besançon
 Orléans

Teams relegated to 2006–07 Pro B
 Brest
 Rouen

 At the end of the 2006–07 season
 2006-07 Pro A Champion: Roanne

Teams promoted from 2006 to 2007 Pro B
 Vichy

Teams relegated to 2007–08 Pro B
 Besançon
 Bourg-en-Bresse
 Reims

Team arenas

Team standings

Playoffs

Awards

Regular Season MVPs 
 "Foreign" MVP:  Dewarick Spencer (Roanne)
 "French" MVP:  Cyril Julian (Nancy)

Best Coach 
  Jean-Denys Choulet (Roanne)

Best Defensive Player 
  Marc-Antoine Pellin (Roanne)

Rising Star Award 
  Nicolas Batum (Le Mans)

References

External links
  LNB website

LNB Pro A seasons
French
basketball
basketball